The Sneppen Bridge is a bridge that crosses the river Steinkjerelva in the town of Steinkjer in the municipality of Steinkjer in Trøndelag county, Norway. The bridge was officially opened on 5 August 1987 by the mayor Erik Bartnes.

See also
List of bridges in Norway
List of bridges in Norway by length
List of bridges
List of bridges by length

References

Road bridges in Trøndelag
European route E6 in Norway
Steinkjer
Bridges completed in 1987
1987 establishments in Norway